RituAlive is a live album and DVD, released in 2003 by the metal band Shaman.

Track listing 
All tracks written by Andre Matos except where noted.

CD
"Ancient Winds"
"Here I Am"
"Distant thunder"
"For Tomorrow"
"Time Will Come"
"Over Your Head"
"Fairy Tale"
"Blind Spell"
"Ritual"
"Sign of the Cross (Avantasia cover)" (Tobias Sammet)
"Pride"
"Eagle Fly Free (Helloween cover)" (Michael Weikath)
"Carry On (Angra cover)"

DVD
"Ancient Winds"
"Here I Am"
"Distant Thunder"
"For Tomorrow"
"Time Will Come"
"Lisbon"
"Guitar Solo"
"Drum Solo"
"Over Your Head"
"Piano Solo"
"Fairy Tale"
"Blind Spell"
"Ritual"
"Sign of the Cross" (Tobias Sammet)
"Pride"
"Carry On"
"Eagle Fly Free" (Michael Weikath)
"Lasting Child"

 "Over Your Head" and "Fairy Tale": Featuring Marcus Viana (electric violin)
 "Sign of the Cross (Avantasia cover)"  and "Pride": Featuring Tobias Sammet (vocals) and Sascha Paeth (guitar).
 "Eagle Fly Free (Helloween cover)": Featuring Andi Deris (vocals) and Michael Weikath (guitar).

Personnel

 Andre Matos - lead vocals, piano, keyboards
 Hugo Mariutti - guitar, backing vocals
 Luís Mariutti - bass, backing vocals
 Ricardo Confessori - drums
 Fábio Ribeiro - keyboards

References

Shaman (Brazilian band) albums
Live video albums
2003 live albums
2003 video albums